Paweł Fajdek (born 4 June 1989) is a Polish hammer thrower, a five-time World Champion, European Champion, Olympic bronze medal winner, multiple Polish Champion and Polish men's hammer throw record holder. In 2013, he became the youngest world champion in the event. His personal best throw of 83.93 metres was achieved on 9 August 2015 at the Janusz Kusociński Memorial in Szczecin.

Career
Fajdek represented Poland at the 2008 World Junior Championships in Bydgoszcz, finishing just off the podium in 4th despite throwing a new Polish junior record of 75.31 metres with the 6 kg under-20 implement. In 2009, his first year as a senior, Fajdek placed 8th at the European U23 Championships in Kaunas, Lithuania with a throw of 68.70 metres. Fajdek placed 3rd at the Polish Championships that year with a mark of 70.86, behind former Olympic and World Champion Szymon Ziółkowski and a returning Wojciech Kondratowicz. In 2010 he grabbed another national bronze, this time with a throw of 73.85 metres; later that year, he improved his personal best to 76.07, good enough for 35th in the world.

Fajdek continued to improve in 2011, finishing second at the European Team Championships in Stockholm with a new personal best of 76.98 metres. He improved further to 78.13 at Madrid, beating among others the reigning Olympic Champion, Primož Kozmus of Slovenia. He was an overwhelming winner at the European U23 Championships in Ostrava, Czech Republic, beating second placer Javier Cienfuegos by five and a half metres to record yet another personal best of 78.54. He also dominated his speciality at the World University Games in Shenzhen, winning the gold with 78.14, more than four metres ahead of silver medallist Marcel Lomnický; a week later at the World Championships in Daegu, however, he only managed 75.20 and finished eleventh.

Fajdek first broke 80 metres at the Ostrava Golden Spike meeting in May 2012, finishing second to Hungary's World silver medallist Krisztián Pars. In his next competition at Montreuil he threw yet another personal best of 81.39, this time beating Pars.

Fajdek is currently coached by Czesław Cybulski, who has also coached Ziółkowski and Anita Włodarczyk.

At the 2020 Summer Olympics, he won his first Olympic medal (bronze) in the men's hammer throw by achieving 81.53 meters, finishing behind Wojciech Nowicki and Eivind Henriksen.

In 2022, by winning gold medal at the 2022 World Athletics Championships with the result of 81.98 meters, Fajdek became only the second athlete in history to win five back-to-back gold medals at the event, after pole vaulter Sergey Bubka, who eventually won six consecutive titles.

Competition record

References

External links

1989 births
Living people
People from Świebodzice
Polish male hammer throwers
Athletes (track and field) at the 2012 Summer Olympics
Athletes (track and field) at the 2016 Summer Olympics
Olympic athletes of Poland
Sportspeople from Lower Silesian Voivodeship
World Athletics Championships athletes for Poland
World Athletics Championships medalists
Articles containing video clips
European Athletics Championships medalists
Universiade medalists in athletics (track and field)
Universiade gold medalists for Poland
World Athletics Championships winners
Medalists at the 2011 Summer Universiade
Medalists at the 2013 Summer Universiade
Medalists at the 2015 Summer Universiade
Medalists at the 2017 Summer Universiade
Athletes (track and field) at the 2020 Summer Olympics
Medalists at the 2020 Summer Olympics
Olympic bronze medalists for Poland
Olympic bronze medalists in athletics (track and field)
20th-century Polish people
21st-century Polish people